Anna Mae Kelly (born ), known professionally as Mae Stephens, is an English singer and songwriter. She peaked at number 18 on the UK Singles Chart in 2023 with her single "If We Ever Broke Up", which initially gained popularity after being teased on Stephens' TikTok account.

Stephens is from Kettering, Northamptonshire. She previously worked at Asda. She regards Freddie Mercury and Sigrid among her musical influences.

Career
Stephens' debut single "I Want You to be Here" was released in March 2020. This was followed on 24 April 2020 with "Devil Eyes" In September 2020, Stephens released "Infamous Kiss", a song she wrote as a way of dealing with going through a "dark patch" in her life. "White Lies" was released in March 2021.

In 2023, Stephens signed with EMI and released "If We Ever Broke Up", her first single on a major label.

Discography
Singles

References

External links

2000s births
Living people
Place of birth missing (living people)
Year of birth missing (living people)
21st-century English women singers
English women pop singers
English women singer-songwriters
British TikTokers
EMI Records artists
People from Kettering
Musicians from Northamptonshire